Gerald John Hillebrand (born March 28, 1940 in Davenport, Iowa) is a former American football linebacker who played nine seasons in the National Football League for the New York Giants, St. Louis Cardinals, and the Pittsburgh Steelers.  He played college football and was drafted in the first round (twelfth overall) of the 1962 NFL Draft.  Hillebrand was also selected in the second round of the 1962 AFL Draft by the Denver Broncos.

1940 births
Living people
American football linebackers
New York Giants players
Pittsburgh Steelers players
Colorado Buffaloes football players
Players of American football from Iowa